Eslamabad (also Romanized as Eslāmābād; also known as Dowlatābād) is a village in Deymkaran Rural District, Salehabad District, Bahar County, Hamadan Province, Iran. At the 2006 census, its population was 303, in 76 families.

References 

Populated places in Bahar County